Bradley V. Green,  (born January 29, 1965 in Fredericton, New Brunswick) is a Canadian lawyer, judge and a former politician in the Province of New Brunswick.

The son of Vernon Green, Green studied at the University of New Brunswick, earning an honours degree in Political science and a law degree.  He was admitted to Bar of New Brunswick in 1991.

He was first elected to the Legislative Assembly of New Brunswick in a 1998 by-election and was re-elected in 1999 and 2003.  He represented the electoral district of Fredericton South and was a member of the cabinet from 1999 to 2006.

His career in the New Brunswick Legislative Assembly ended when he lost his seat in 2006 to Liberal MLA, Rick Miles.

In May 2008, he was appointed a Judge of the Court of Queen's Bench for the judicial district of Saint John. Green was named to the Court of Appeal of New Brunswick in Fredericton on September 1, 2009.

Green married Margaret Gregg.

References 

1965 births
Living people
University of New Brunswick alumni
Lawyers in New Brunswick
Canadian King's Counsel
Judges in New Brunswick
Progressive Conservative Party of New Brunswick MLAs
Members of the Executive Council of New Brunswick
Politicians from Fredericton
University of New Brunswick Faculty of Law alumni
21st-century Canadian politicians
Attorneys General of New Brunswick